The , occasionally abbreviated as Nose Railway or , is a Japanese private railway company headquartered in Kawanishi, Hyogo, which links several areas in the mountainous Nose, Osaka, area to Kawanishi-noseguchi Station in Kawanishi, where one can transfer to Hankyu Takarazuka Line to Osaka.

Nose Electric Railway is a principal subsidiary of Hankyu Corporation. A rush-hour special express train, the Nissei Limited Express, operates from Nissei-chuo Station to Umeda Station, the terminal of Hankyu in Osaka, in the morning and back again in the evening for commuters.

Lines and stations

Nose Railway has two lines:
 Myōken Line (Kawanishi-noseguchi - Myōkenguchi)
 Nissei Line (Yamashita - Nissei-chuo) 
The former is the main route and the latter branches off at Yamashita Station.

In addition to the railway, Nose Railway operates a funicular (Myoken Cable) and a chairlift (Myoken Lift).

Operations
S: Trains stop; |, ↑: Trains pass; ↑: Only one direction
 trains are operated all day every day
 trains run from Nissei Chūō to Osaka-umeda in the morning, and vice versa in the evening on weekdays.

Myoken Cable and Myoken Lift

Rolling stock
Nose Railway uses second-hand EMUs from Hankyu. The trains operate on  track.

, the fleet operated is as follows.

 1700 series 4-car EMUs x 6 (former Hankyu 2000 series)
 3100 series 4-car EMU x 1 (former Hankyu 3100 series)
 5100 series 4-car EMUs x 5 and 2-car EMUs x 2 (former Hankyu 5100 series, transferred 2014-2016)
 6000 series 8-car EMU x 1 (former Hankyu 6000 series, transferred in August 2014)

A four-car 7200 series EMU (set 7200) is scheduled to enter service on 19 March 2018. This is made up of former Hankyu EMU cars.

Former rolling stock
 1500 series EMUs (former Hankyu 2100 series)

History
The Nose Electric Railway was founded on 23 May 1908. The Kawanishi-noseguchi to Ichinotorii section opened on 13 April 1913, electrified at 600 V DC. The extension to Myōkenguchi was opened on 3 November 1923.

The line voltage was increased from 600 V to 1,500 V DC on 26 March 1995.

See also
 List of railway lines in Japan

References

This article incorporates material from the corresponding article in the Japanese Wikipedia.

Railway companies of Japan
Rail transport in Osaka Prefecture
Rail transport in Hyōgo Prefecture
Standard gauge railways in Japan
Companies based in Hyōgo Prefecture
Japanese companies established in 1908
Hankyu Hanshin Holdings